The Cannon Hill Anglican College (commonly known as CHAC) is an independent Anglican co-educational day school, located in the Brisbane suburb of , in the state of Queensland, Australia.

History 
The College, originally called Cannon Hill College, opened in 1989 with eighty-nine students and three buildings. In 1994, it became an Anglican school in the Diocese of Brisbane, and changed its name to Cannon Hill Anglican College to reflect this. The school has had five principals: Rod Wells, the College founder, Suzanne Bain, Greg Wain, Robyn Bell and current Principal Gary O'Brien. Currently, the school caters for Prep to Year 12, with upwards of approximately 1000 students. It is a co-educational school. From 30 March until 22 May, full-scale operations were interrupted due to the COVID-19 Pandemic and under advice from the Queensland Government. Regular schooling was re-introduced on 25 May, after a slow re-introduction of senior students back to the college.

Facilities 
The College has a number of modern facilities, including an 1100-seat auditorium, a design and technology workshop, product design studio, graphic design studio and a research centre. A new science facility on the west side of the school. Sporting facilities include basketball, cricket, hockey, netball, rugby, football (soccer), touch football, tennis, athletics, and volleyball.

Most noteworthy of the College's facilities is its integrated arts facility, which incorporates a visual arts wing and lecture theatre; music centre with sound-proof teaching studios (including the professional recording studio Ghostgum Audio); orchestral recording studio and dedicated drama studios.

Houses 
CHAC's Houses are all named after islands in Moreton Bay. Initially, there were only four Houses - Moreton, Peel, Saint Helena and Stradbroke. In 2001, two new Houses, Macleay and Russell, were added.

Notable alumni 

 Seja Vogel, graduated 1998, keyboardist for Sekiden and Regurgitator
 Josh Bristow, graduated 2009, Journalist for FOX SPORTS Australia. 
 Matt McGuire, graduated 2010, drummer for The Chainsmokers.
 Rachael Watson, graduated 2009, 2x Australian Paralympic gold medallist and Paralympic 50 metre freestyle S4 world record holder.

See also 

 List of schools in Queensland
 List of Anglican schools in Australia

References

External links
 

Anglican primary schools in Brisbane
Anglican high schools in Brisbane
Educational institutions established in 1989
Cannon Hill, Queensland
1989 establishments in Australia
Anglican Diocese of Brisbane
The Associated Schools member schools